Alangudi is a village in the Papanasam taluk of Thanjavur district, Tamil Nadu, India.

Demographics 

As per the 2010 census, Alangudi had a total population of 1674 with 791 males and 883 females. The sex ratio was 1116. The literacy rate was 69.42.

References 

 

Villages in Thanjavur district